Thieves After Dark is a 1984 drama film directed by Samuel Fuller and starring Véronique Jannot and Bobby Di Cicco. The film was entered into the 34th Berlin International Film Festival.

Cast
Véronique Jannot as Isabelle
Bobby Di Cicco as Francois
Victor Lanoux as Insp. Farbet
Stéphane Audran as Isabella's mother
Camille de Casabianca as Corinne
Micheline Presle as Geneviève
Christa Lang as Solange
Marthe Villalonga as The Concierge

References

External links

1984 films
1984 drama films
French drama films
1980s English-language films
English-language French films
Films directed by Samuel Fuller
Films scored by Ennio Morricone
1980s French films